The Spectrum Pursuit Vehicle (or SPV) is a fictional pursuit and attack vehicle from Gerry and Sylvia Anderson's science-fiction television series Captain Scarlet and the Mysterons (1967).

Specifications
The metallic-blue, tank-like SPV serves as Spectrum's primary armoured interceptor ground vehicle. It is fitted with five pairs of wheels (the three over the front, middle and rear axles constituting the main drive), with additional traction for mountainous environments provided by rear-mounted, hydraulically-lowered caterpillar tracks.

Within the hermetically-sealed control compartment, the driver, co-driver and a passenger are seated backwards, facing the rear, to reduce the possibility of injury in the event of a crash; the driver is aided by a video monitor displaying (vertically-flipped) forward and rear views. It is armed with a front-mounted cannon, housed underneath a fold-away panel, and is also equipped with ejector seats and radar. The hydrogenic power unit can be removed and re-assembled as a personal jet pack, or other devices of comparable size (additional components for which are stored towards the back of the vehicle).

SPVs are distributed worldwide and are requisitioned from disguised buildings and other structures, guarded by undercover operatives. A Spectrum agent can access an SPV only upon presenting his or her identification to the relevant authority. SPVs are amphibious, all-terrain vehicles that can be driven in extreme environments as well as in cities.

Appearances
In the pilot episode, "The Mysterons," Captain Blue requisitions an SPV from a gas station, where it is hidden inside a fake truck. The station attendant comments that it must be a challenge to drive backwards. Captain Blue's evident expertise in driving SPVs is revealed in this episode; by contrast, Captain Scarlet himself is only moderately skilled at handling SPVs, as he tends to crash them in several episodes.

In "Winged Assassin," an SPV is used to take on the DT-19 Stratojet on the runway as its Mysteron controllers try to deliberately crash into the Director General's own airplane. As the Mysterons somehow disable the cannons on the SPV's front (Captain Blue presses the "Fire" buttons but nothing happens), Captain Scarlet ejects Captain Blue and, in what would normally be a suicidal maneuver, rams the wheels of the DT-19 as it is speeding on the runway to try to stop it. The SPV is then crashed in a tracking station after the DT-19 is thus grounded.

In "Point 783," an SPV hidden in a shop in a small bazaar in the desert is requisitioned by Captain Scarlet under orders to evacuate the Supreme Commander of Earth Forces from the command outpost under attack by the Mysteron-interfered, virtually indestructible, Unitron tank. Captain Scarlet uses the ejector seats after, whilst being pursued by the Unitron, he and the Commander are at gunpoint from one of the Mysteron-rendered majors assigned to the Commander. The SPV and the Unitron fall off a cliff as the SPV no longer had a driver but the Unitron was homing in on the Mysteron major still inside the vehicle. Surprisingly the shot does not show any substantial damage to the SPV after the plunge (it was still intact although the Mysteron was surely killed) and yet the Unitron that fell on top of it was completely unusable.

In "Manhunt," Captain Black gives his hostage Symphony Angel a chance to escape by using the SPV he himself had stolen from a gas station. This eventually derails the entire Spectrum operation as all personnel end up following the SPV with Symphony, not Captain Black, at the controls. In this episode Captain Scarlet notes that the village he and Blue passed, Stone Point Village, was aptly named as SPV.

When Captain Scarlet pursues a renegade air conditioning maintenance truck under Mysteron controllers intent on destroying key links in the Frost Line Outer Space Missile Defense System in the episode "Avalanche", the SPV takes a battering after liquid oxygen renders the snowy, icy road too slippery to be safe, causing the SPV to crash in the mountains. Captain Scarlet had no external injuries in the crash. This particular SPV requisitioned by Captain Scarlet and Lieutenant Green was stored in a log cabin under the attendance of a French-Canadian logger and was driven off-road in the snow in a bid to lose some of the distance between it and the truck.

In "Shadow of Fear," an SPV is stationed outside the K14 Observatory. It does not see any action. When the observatory is blown up the ensuing avalanche purportedly takes the SPV with it. Due to the Himalayan terrain, the SPV's role as an active field vehicle is taken up by aerial vehicles like the Spectrum Helicopter, the Angels, and even Cloudbase itself. Note that the SPV was perfectly functional in "Avalanche," which used the same backdrop.

In "Fire at Rig 15," Scarlet requisitions SPV no. 1034 hidden in an oil storage tank near the Bensheba refinery to seek and destroy Jason Smith's truck filled with explosives. Scarlet cuts across the desert (the same set used for the Unitron at Point 783) and guns the SPV over a ditch and some dunes. He then engages in a high-speed pursuit with Smith, the SPV surviving an explosive strewn by Smith, and then rams the truck off the road. The SPV crashes into an oil storage tank in the perimeter of Bensheba and bursts into flames.

In "The Trap," SPV A75 is requisitioned by Captain Blue to stop Commodore Goddard's Mysteron likeness from "clipping the wings of the world," i.e. assassinating the top ten commanders of Earth's Air Forces. It was housed in a garage hidden by a billboard under the maintenance of the Auld Lang Syne Company. Upon its arrival at Glengarry Castle, Scotland, Captain Scarlet uses its jet pack to hunt down Goddard who was stationed with a machine-gun on the battlements. Once the delegates are free, Blue uses the SPV rockets to destroy Goddard. The SPV does get shot a few times by Goddard, but its bulletproof armor saves Captain Blue.

In "Model Spy," an SPV is requisitioned by Captain Blue (as Adam Swenson) to hunt down Captain Black and his hostage Henri Verdain. Captain Scarlet (as Paul Metcalfe) is picked up by Captain Blue and both force Black into a tunnel, where he is compelled to dispose of Verdain before making good his escape with his Mysteron powers. The SPV was stored in a hidden garage adjacent to a casino.

In "Special Assignment," the SPV's function as an assault vehicle (based upon its origins as a modified tank) becomes the focus of the plot. The Mysterons wish to break through security at Nuclear City with an SPV, and are hiring Captain Scarlet, now stripped of his captaincy, to help. Scarlet is actually a double agent working for Spectrum and manages to fool the Mysterons by acquiring and driving the SPV for them. In order not to break his cover, when Scarlet requisitions the SPV, he cannot show his Spectrum ID card and has to knock out the attendant of the gas station where the SPV was stored. Scarlet, to warn the Angels of the status of the SPV without breaking his cover to his Mysteron passengers, causes the SPV to emit black smoke. Scarlet ejects from the SPV and the Angels destroy it before it reaches Nuclear City.

In "Place of Angels," an SPV is used numerous times by Scarlet and Blue as transport while they are tracking a suspect understood to have a K14 virus on their person.

In "Expo 2068," an SPV pursues a transporter thought to have a nuclear device. When it is discovered that the device was switched into a freight helicopter of the Seneca Construction Co., the SPV is raced to the site of the Expo. Scarlet uses the SPV's jet pack to reach the helicopter.

In "Noose of Ice," an SPV is driven to the tritonium mine at the North Pole. When the mine is beginning to collapse because the safety mechanisms have been disabled at a booster station, Scarlet takes the SPV across the frozen turnpike to reach the mine, managing to get clear just before the bridge becomes too unstable and falls apart.

In "Treble Cross," numerous SPVs are seen trying to stop Captain Black leaving Weston Airfield.

In "The Inquisition," Captain Scarlet evacuates Captain Blue and, using the SPV rocket, destroys his captors's dummy Cloudbase model where they confused Captain Blue in hopes to gain Spectrum secrets.

In "Inferno," Captains Scarlet and Blue watch from afar in an SPV as the Najama desalinisation plant where they both were sent with Captains Ochre and Magenta goes up in flames due to a Mysteron-controlled rocket's crash.

Background

In 2002, Gerry Anderson explained how the vehicle's safety features were borne out of his "preoccupation" – demonstrated in various aspects of Captain Scarlet – "with things not being what they seemed ...With a flick of a switch the walls of these buildings would collapse to reveal this astonishing vehicle inside. I knew kids would find that exciting." He quickly regretted his decision to make the seats rear-facing, commenting: " ... we began to realise that the audience was going to say, 'Why are these people facing backwards?' So we wrote an explanation into the first script. Then I realised that not everyone would have seen that episode so we had to put explanations in again and again." The rear-facing system is well received by commentators Jim Sangster and Paul Condon, who praise Anderson's innovation and credit the feature as a "work of genius".

The SPV was designed by special effects director Derek Meddings on the basis of a brief description given in the Andersons' original script for the first episode, which specified only that the SPV was a high-speed armoured vehicle with reversed seating (and thus no windscreen) and a removable "lightweight power unit". Noting that the occupants faced backwards and viewed the road through a TV monitor, Meddings said that "all [this] meant to me was that I could design the vehicle without windows." For added realism, these were replaced with grilles and air vents. To fulfil his vision of a "menacing, shark-like" assault vehicle, Meddings added a tail fin to the design. He also incorporated a broad front bumper, intended to be shock-absorbent, and five pairs of wheels (in two sizes), as he thought that vehicles with more wheels "looked more interesting on screen." He said that he was pleased with the SPV design because he believed that it "could be filmed from any angle".

Several filming models were built.

Toys and kits
Various toy versions of the SPV have been released. These include a 1960s plastic friction-drive toy by Century 21 Toys and die-cast models by Dinky as well as newer toys by Corgi, Product Enterprises and Vivid Imaginations. Dinky's version, which remained on sale until 1975, was its best-selling product of all time and one of the most popular die-cast toys ever made in the UK.

Meddings' assistant, Mike Trim, made his own version of the SPV.

Reception and influence
Andrew Blair of website Den of Geek calls the SPV "clearly the best vehicle in the show". Comparing it to "a tank driven at ludicrous speeds, while facing backwards and located in secret garages around the world", he argues that the vehicle represents "probably the fastest transformation from covert to ridiculously unsubtle that fiction has ever seen." James Taylor of Car magazine ranks the SPV one of the top 10 vehicles from the Gerry Anderson productions. On the vehicle's design, he comments that "all-round visibility [was] clearly not a priority of Captain Scarlet's employers." Writing for TV Zone magazine, Tat Wood questions Spectrum's logic in keeping its SPVs hidden until they are needed ("inside caravans, gasometers, tubes of Pringles or wherever") given that they are "then abandoned on the road".

The SPV's curved front bumper inspired the rounded edges of LaCie's "Rugged" external hard drive designed by Neil Poulton.

The Rhino
In the computer-animated remake series Gerry Anderson's New Captain Scarlet (2005), the successor to the SPV is the Spectrum Rhino. The Rhino is more heavily armed than the SPV, and unlike the original is incapable of travelling on water. Instead of being hidden in safehouses, it is deployed from Skybase via Albatross dropships. The driver of the Rhino adopts a normal driving position, in contrast with his predecessor.

References

Works cited

External links
Spectrum Headquarters: Spectrum Pursuit Vehicle

Captain Scarlet (franchise)
Fictional armoured fighting vehicles
Fictional elements introduced in 1967